Ramon Silvestre De Jesus Ferrer (born August 31, 1983) is a Dominican professional baseball umpire. He made his Major League Baseball (MLB) debut on April 22, 2016, thus becoming the first MLB umpire from the Dominican Republic. De Jesus wears number 18, which was most previously worn by former umpire Marcus Pattillo.

During the 2016 season, De Jesus umpired 97 big league games (25 as the home plate umpire), and issued one ejection, Miami Marlins coach Tim Wallach. During the 2017 season, De Jesus issued several ejections, including Los Angeles Dodgers second baseman Chase Utley, following a disagreement over De Jesus' positioning on the field.  De Jesus was the first base umpire for the inaugural MLB Little League Classic, on August 20, 2017, in Williamsport, Pennsylvania. Ramon De Jesus worked as one of the replay officials for the 2022 Division Series round of the playoffs.

See also 
 List of Major League Baseball umpires

References

External links
Career statistics and umpire information from The Baseball Cube, or Retrosheet
Ramon De Jesus at Close Call Sports

1983 births
Living people
Major League Baseball umpires
Sportspeople from Santo Domingo